Joshua Morgan Brown is an American author, columnist, blogger, commentator on CNBC, and CEO of New York City-based Ritholtz Wealth Management, an independent investment advisory firm he founded with Barry Ritholtz. He is also a contributing columnist to Yahoo! Finance, Business Insider, and serves on the board of advisors for Brightscope and Upside. "Downtown" Josh Brown was ranked the No. 1 financial Twitter follow by The Wall Street Journal in 2013. Brown also co-hosts a weekly podcast with Michael Batnick entitled The Compound & Friends.

Writing
Brown is the author of Backstage Wallstreet, published in 2012. His second book was released in 2014, Clash of the Financial Pundits co-authored with CNBC and Yahoo! Finance commentator Jeff Macke. He is also the author of The Reformed Broker, a widely read blog about "markets, politics, economics, media, culture and finance". The Reformed Broker blog celebrated its fifth anniversary on November 10, 2013.

Personal life
Brown is a resident of Long Island, New York.

References

External links
 The Reformed Broker (Brown's blog)
 CNBC Contributor Page
 Yahoo Finance Contributions

Living people
American business writers
American male bloggers
American bloggers
American economics writers
American finance and investment writers
American male writers
21st-century American non-fiction writers
Year of birth missing (living people)